Miloš Vemić (born 8 March 1987) is a Serbian volleyball player, a member of Serbia men's national volleyball team and Polish club BBTS Bielsko-Biała, 2007 Serbian Champion, 2011 German Champion.

Career
He bstarted his career as a player of his hometown team OK Vojvodina. In 2007 his team became Serbian Champion. He left the club in 2010 as a captain. In 2010 he went to German VfB Friedrichshafen and stayed there two season. In 2011 he became German Champion. In 2012 he signed one-year contract with Turkish Maliye Milli Piyango SK. Then he spent per one season in three clubs: Al-Ahli Club Dubai, Tourcoing Lille, OK Vojvodina Novi Sad. In 2016 he signed contract with Polish team BBTS Bielsko-Biała.

Sporting achievements

Clubs

National championships
 2004/2005  Serbian and Montenegrin Cup, with OK Vojvodina Novi Sad
 2004/2005  Serbian and Montenegrin Championship, with OK Vojvodina Novi Sad
 2005/2006  Serbian and Montenegrin Cup, with OK Vojvodina Novi Sad
 2005/2006  Serbian and Montenegrin Championship, with OK Vojvodina Novi Sad
 2006/2007  Serbian Cup, with OK Vojvodina Novi Sad
 2006/2007  Serbian Championship, with OK Vojvodina Novi Sad
 2007/2008  Serbian Championship, with OK Vojvodina Novi Sad
 2008/2009  Serbian Championship, with OK Vojvodina Novi Sad
 2009/2010  Serbian Cup, with OK Vojvodina Novi Sad
 2010/2011  German Championship, with VfB Friedrichshafen
 2011/2012  German Cup, with VfB Friedrichshafen
 2011/2012  German Championship, with VfB Friedrichshafen
 2015/2016  Serbian Championship, with OK Vojvodina Novi Sad

References

External links
 FIVB profile 

1987 births
Living people
Sportspeople from Novi Sad
Serbian men's volleyball players
Expatriate volleyball players in Poland
Serbian expatriate sportspeople in Germany
Serbian expatriate sportspeople in Turkey
Serbian expatriate sportspeople in the United Arab Emirates
Serbian expatriate sportspeople in France
Serbian expatriate sportspeople in Poland